A high king is a type of king ranked above other monarchs. High King may also refer to:

High-King, a Japanese pop idol group
High King Mountain Ski Area, a ski resort in Austria
High King of Ireland, a historical title
Hochkönig (English: High King), the highest mountain in the Berchtesgaden Alps, Austria
The High King, a 1968 novel by Lloyd Alexander
The High Kings, an Irish folk band

See also
Halls of the High King, a Dungeons & Dragons module
The High King's Tomb, a 2007 novel
Adipati (disambiguation), Sanskrit title, lirerally "high king"
King of Kings (disambiguation)
Maharaja (disambiguation), title of Indian kings, literally "great king"